The Scottish Rite Cathedral is a historic Masonic Temple located at Joplin, Jasper County, Missouri. It was built in 1923, and is a two-story, Beaux Arts style concrete and terra cotta social hall.  It sits on a raised basement and features fluted Ionic order columns and pilasters.

It was listed on the National Register of Historic Places in 1990.

References

Masonic buildings in Missouri
Clubhouses on the National Register of Historic Places in Missouri
Beaux-Arts architecture in Missouri
Masonic buildings completed in 1923
Buildings and structures in Joplin, Missouri
National Register of Historic Places in Jasper County, Missouri